Svitlana Yeremenko  — born 15 March 1959, is a Ukrainian journalist, editor, media-expert, NGO (non-governmental non-profit organizations) manager and the author of the book “Art, as prayer”.

Biography 
Svitlana Yeremenko was born in Volytsia, Mostytskyi district, Lviv region. She grew up and graduated high school at Chervonoarmiisk, Zhytomyr region. In 1983 Svitlana completed her studies at Taras Shevchenko National University of Kyiv, department of journalism. In 1998 she also completed an internship in the United States and Poland and received a NGO Manager Certificate.

Career 
 1983-1994 — “Donbass Komsomolets” (“Accent”) youth newspaper editorial office: correspondent, deputy of department, department editor. In September 1993 she was illegally dismissed from her employment because of national convictions: «The only fault that Svitlana Yeremenko had, was her commitment to the Ukrainian national identity, not being ashamed of her native language and standing up for her views…»; «S.Yeremenko’s loyalty to Ukrainian subject matter does not conform to the staff pattern in any way…».

Svitlana was supported by the community as well as the Donetsk district department of the National Union of Journalists of Ukraine that “stood up in defense for S. Yeremenko and protested against her illegal dismissal”. «Nothing  like this has ever happened before, at least in the Donetsk region: a journalist has initiated a lawsuit against her own management…».  Svitlana regained her position with the decision of the Kyiv National Court of Donetsk. She voluntarily left the post in 1994, because of the continued bullying. The “Club of native language” (the Ukrainian centerfold of the Russian newspaper) was closed and “under no means was she allowed to write political content.., cover the problems of the Ukrainian school…”.

S. Yeremenko — is one of the most active journalists of Donetsk who told the truth about the RUKH – People’s Movement of Ukraine ("The Movement") while pro-party (communist) publications picked on it. In particular, she initiated a series of interviews with famous activists of the national democratic movement: I.Drach, V. Iavorivsky, V. Pylypchiuk, and M. Horyn. From the first years of its existence she supported the Society of Ukrainian Language, advocated for the opening of the first Ukrainian school and Ukrainian lyceum in Donetsk.  Svitlana participated in and informed the readers about the cultural and ecological hiking trip “Dzvin - 90”, the International Congress of Ukrainians, and “Chervona Ruta” festival. She worked actively for the independence of Ukraine before the All-national Referendum on the 1st of December 1991....  Svitlana wrote about the first strikes of miners and "The Movement's" conferences.

 In 1992 Svitlana became a member of the foundational editorial board of the first independent newspaper in the Donetsk region – “Skhidnyi Chasopys” (“The Eastern Journal”) in Ukrainian (she was the only professional journalist in the editorial office),  founded by the Donetsk district Society of Ukrainian language, first as an addition to the “Donnechchyna” newspaper, and then as an independent periodical. In 1997 the newspaper ceased to exist due to a variety of reasons, and also financial difficulties.
 From 1995 to 2004 she was a co-founder and chief editor of the scientific, analytical and information magazine – “Skhid” (“The East”).
 In 2001 Svitlana created the Donetsk public organization of journalists, “Donetsk press-club”; co-founder and director of the club. The mission of the press-club was uniting the journalists, organizing of meetings and press-conferences on current issues that were important for the public. Starting from 2007 Svitlana managed the National press-club of the Center for Ukrainian Reforms and Education in Kyiv.
 From 2004 she was the editor of the analytical and information magazine “Aspekty Samovriaduvannia” – “The Aspects of self governance”, of the US-Ukraine Foundation. «During the time of S. Yeremenko’s editorship, the magazine had become the handbook for mayors and local governance experts”.
 From 2011 to present — Pylyp Orlyk Institute for Democracy. Svitlana coordinates general flow of projects for the institute. The main area of study for the institute is the systematic analysis of the civic society issues and the development of democracy in Ukraine.
 From 2012 to present Svitlana is in charge of the Center for Ukrainian Reforms and Education (CURE) project, monitoring regional mass media for the presence of so-called “jeans” material (articles with signs of political or commercial commissioning ) and compliance with the professional standards of journalism in Lviv, Donetsk, Kharkiv, Vinnytsia and Sumy regions of Ukraine as well as Crimea.   In her speeches, Svitlana sharply raises the issues of the freedom of speech, proficiency level of journalists, and the necessity of maintaining professional ethics.

Social activism 
From 2001 to 2004 Svitlana managed the Coalition of non-governmental organizations -“Partnership for transparent society” - fighting against corruption in the Donetsk region. (Eighteen NGOs were members of the Partnership).

In October and November 2004 she was the coordinator for the International Observation Mission in Ukraine (ENEMO ) in the Donetsk region. Svitlana organized the work of international observers during the presidential elections in 2004.

She is the author of various projects aimed at the development of democracy, strengthening of the civic society, fighting corruption, affirmation of the freedom of speech, negotiating the productive dialog between mass-media and NGOs, and engaging the citizens in participation as well as high public activity during elections.

Books 
The History of the Ukrainian and World culture. - «The Eastern publication house». 1999 р. (Editor).

Choose your own future! — «Ukrainian Center of Cultural Studies», 1998 (co-author of the concept, design and contents for the collection of brochures, the aim of which was engaging citizens to participate in the presidential elections).

Oleg Minko album cover. Svitlana Yeremenko – the author of the novel/essay: “Oleg Minko: Art as a prayer”, - «CityPress Company», 2010.

Oleh Minko. — Citi Press Company, 2010 (this is the book and the album about the unique Ukrainian postmodern artist. Svitlana is the author of the concept and text: «Art, as prayer», that combines artistic and documentary views together with art analysis). ... One may place Svitlana Yeremenko’s «Art, as prayer» along with essays about Émile Zola,  Henri Perruchot, Bogomil Rainov ...» (Valentyn Hrytsanenko, the honored artist of Ukraine, professor from Kharkiv. Program “Knyzhkovyj koshyk”, Kharkiv district television.).

"Postati" (Figures). Essays about the famous people of Donbass. — «The East publication house», 2011. (coauthor. «Ukraine – my true Motherland». The author of the essay about the famous composer, Serhiy Prokofiev).

The author of novels and essays. Is published by the literature and art magazines “Kyiv”, “Berezil”, “Dnipro”, “Ukrainian Literature newspaper” and “Literary Ukraine”.

Personal life 
Divorced, has two children.

Interests 
Svitlana is interested in art. She is the author of a number of articles and reviews on art in the “Den” newspaper and the “Ukrainian Literature newspaper”, art magazines – “Muzeinyj provulok”, “Artania”, and a series of stories on “Svoboda” radio. Svitlana’s other interests include literature, ballet, theatre, tennis, and travelling.

Sources 

Ukrainian journalists
Ukrainian writers
Living people
1959 births
People from Lviv Oblast